Yang Xingfo, also spelt Yang Hsingfo (楊杏佛) and otherwise known as Yang Chu'en (楊銓)(Born May 4, 1893, Zhangshu, Jiangxi - June 18, 1933 French Concession, Shanghai) was a Chinese management scholar and activist. He was professor at National Central University in Nanjing (then known as Nanking) and co-founded the Science Society of China while studying at Cornell University.

References

People from Zhangshu
Cornell University alumni
Tongmenghui members
Republic of China economists
Chinese human rights activists
Chinese activists